Catherine Norah "Cathy" Muñoz (née Engstrom;  born June 23, 1964) is an American politician who was a Republican member of the Alaska House of Representatives, who from 2009 to 2017 represented the 34th District. She served as Co-Chair of the Community and Regional Affairs Committee, Vice-Chair of the Education Committee, and served two terms on the House Finance Committee. She served as Co-Chair of the Community & Regional Affairs Committee and Vice-Chair of the Education Committee. Muñoz has been a small business owner since 1988. She was appointed by Governor Michael J. Dunleavy in 2018 to serve as the Deputy Commissioner of the Alaska Department of Labor and Workforce Development. Muñoz was a third-generation member of the Alaska Legislature. Her father served in the Alaska House and Senate, her grandfather as the mayor of Douglas, Alaska and in the Territorial and State Senates, and her grandmother served in the Territorial House.

Early political experience 
Past political and government positions include City and Borough of Juneau (CBJ) Assembly: 3 Terms, Chair, CBJ Finance, Chair, CBJ Human, Resources Committee, CBJ liaison to School Board and Parks & Recreation Advisory Committee, Former Chair, Trails, Working Group, Chair, Affordable Housing and Alternate Member: Alaska Seafood Marketing Institute. Member of the Alaska Native Sisterhood and the Alaska Humanities Forum.

House of Representatives 
In 2008, Muñoz beat Democratic incumbent Andrea Doll in District 4, 50.6% to 48.4%. In 2014 Democrat George McGuan ran against Muñoz in district 34. Muñoz won 62.4% of the votes and McGuan won 37.6% of the votes in a mainly Republican district. It was the first time she had faced opposition in six years. In 2016, Democrat Justin Parish beat her 50.9% to 48.5% on a platform of fiscal responsibility. Parish declined to run for reelection after a single term and was succeeded by Democrat Andi Story. Juneau's representative Justin Parish won't seek re-election, KTOO-TV, Jacob Resneck, April 24, 2018. Retrieved August 25, 2019.

Sponsored legislation 
Muñoz’s legislative work focused on support for small business, public education and the environment.  She sponsored legislation offering tax incentives for contributions to public education,  as well as new housing development. She authored legislation strengthening Alaska’s Oil Spill and Response capabilities, and carried legislation for Governor Sean Parnell which committed $3 billion to pay down Alaska’s retirement debt.

Gun Control: Muñoz supported pro second amendment legislation.

Equal Rights: Muñoz voted for same-sex marriage and supported the inclusion of gender identity in Alaska's anti-discrimination laws.

Personal life
Muñoz is a fourth-generation Alaskan. She and her husband Juan have two children, Mercedes and Matthew. She graduated from Juneau-Douglas High School, and received a Bachelor of Arts in political science from the University of the Pacific (United States).  She was crowned Miss Juneau in 1982. Her mother-in-law was the famed Alaskan artist Rie Muñoz.

Muñoz is Episcopalian. As a teenager she worked aboard fishing scows and in fish processing plants on the "slime line." Cathy worked in the Ad Lib art gallery in downtown Juneau which she opened with her mother Sally, until she decided to run for the legislature in 2008. Cathy's father, Republican Elton Engstrom, served in the state House from 1965-1966 and the Senate from 1967-1971. His father Elton Engstrom Sr. was a territorial and state senator who died in office in 1963. Elton Sr. Served as the Chairman of the Republican Party of the Territory of Alaska for twenty years. and his mother served in the 18th Territorial Legislature in 1947.

References

External links
 Alaska State House Majority Site
 Alaska State Legislature Biography
 Project Vote Smart profile
 Representative Cathy Muñoz's Blog
 Cathy Engstrom Munoz at 100 Years of Alaska's Legislature

1964 births
20th-century American politicians
20th-century American women politicians
21st-century American politicians
21st-century American women politicians
American people of Swedish descent
Businesspeople from Alaska
Living people
Republican Party members of the Alaska House of Representatives
Politicians from Juneau, Alaska
University of the Pacific (United States) alumni
Women state legislators in Alaska